The Brussels S-train, also known as the Brussels Regional Express Network ( or RER); ( or GEN) is a suburban rail system in the Brussels Capital Region. It will offer fast connections and increased frequency within a 30 km radius of the city, covering a territory inhabited by 2.5 million people.

Most jobs in the Brussels-Capital Region are filled by workers from other regions. Private vehicles clog the city daily, hampering mobility and creating pollution. The RER/GEN is a response to these growing problems. Only 20% of commuters use public transport daily; the goal is to double this figure by facilitating movement into and within the city.

Total costs for the GEN/RER project will be at least €2.173bn.  The initially planned nine lines  have since increased to 12; but the projected frequency of "a departure at least every 15 minutes" has not been implemented as of early 2018: most services run once per hour, a few twice per hour.

The scope includes widening existing railway lines from double to quadruple; a few additions like the Schuman-Josaphat tunnel; the creation or re-activation of stations just outside the Brussels city centre (Germoir/Mouterij and Arcades/Arcaden on the South-East, Brussels-West and Tour et Taxis/Thurn en Taxis on the West); and the acquisition of new rolling stock.

History
A first draft of the RER/GEN network was published in 1995. The commissioning of the first lines was then planned for 2002.

Construction requires the approval and funding from the federal government and the three regions as well as the collaboration of four public transit companies (NMBS/SNCB, MIVB/STIB, De Lijn and TEC). The initial work started in 2005, and service was supposed to start in 2012. However, Belgium's administrative complexity caused numerous delays and postponements; the network will now be put into service between 2015 and 2025.

Infrastructure
Railway lines within a  radius of Brussels are included in the project. Parts of the project are already in place. The most substantial works relate to the quad-tracking of several lines: two tracks for GEN/RER trains, and two tracks for intercity and high-speed trains.

The RER/GEN project includes a  double-tracked Schuman-Josaphat tunnel in the north east of the city. This links the European Quarter to Brussels Airport, cutting  to 13 minutes journey times between the two.

Most of the network uses existing rail lines. Increased frequencies and passengers, however, requires other significant infrastructure projects, in addition to the Schuman-Josaphat tunnel:

 Quad-tracking of sections in order to segregate local and regional traffic from faster inter-city trains
 Demolition and reconstruction of several bridges that cross the wider track
 Construction of additional breakpoints
 Installation of noise barriers
 Redevelopment of 28 existing stations in Brussels
 Creation of transfer points
 Construction of park-and-ride lots

Rolling stock
As of 2020 most services are operated by Siemens Desiro and MS86 ("Sprinter") EMUs.

NMBS/SNCB had ordered 305 Siemens Desiro ML single-deck electric multiple units, a €1.425bn contract. These will have a 2MW power rating and a capacity of 280. The deal represents a break from NMBS/SNCB sourcing its stock from Bombardier, with construction announced as being at Siemens' plant in Krefeld-Uerdingen, Germany.

Network

In 2010, the NMBS/SNCB website projected nine GEN/RER lines, to be up and running by 2012. The map numbers eight lines, while a ninth line (Wavre - Villers-la-Ville) is depicted but not included in the map legend.

2009 plan 
A study conducted by Significance, Stratec, Tractebel and Tritel for the FPS Mobility and Transport in 2008-2009 presented its vision for the GEN/RER in the longer term.

The plan envisages a direct link between Ottignies and Leuven in 2015, with a service between Dendermonde and Mechelen and a connection to Gosselies airport (Brussels South Charleroi Airport) in 2020. Further possibilities for expansion are proposed for 2030.

2015 plan 
A plan was presented by the head of Belgian Railways in March 2015 to start operations on 13 December 2015. The network was then to comprise 12 lines (from S1 to S20, see below).

Due to a delay of the works (because of the Brussels lockdown) on the Schuman-Josaphat Tunnel, the lines S5 and S9 have an amended journey until April 2016.

The complete network was expected be completed by 2025.

N.B. S20 connects Leuven (S2/S9) and Ottignies (S8/S81) without passing through Brussels Capital Region.

A new service, S19, started operations in February 2022, between Charleroi-South and Brussels-Airport; it replaced an Intercity service.

See also

 Trams in Brussels
 Brussels Metro
 Transport in Brussels
 List of commuter rail systems

External links
 The Regional Express Network, Infrabel
 SNCB (in French)  NMBS (in Dutch)  SNCB/NMBS (in English)
 Siemens information on Desiro ML trains.

References

Rail transport in Brussels
Regional rail